Zighan (also Romanized as Zīghān; also known as Zīqān) is a village in Arudan Rural District, in the Central District of Mohr County, Fars Province, Iran. At the 2006 census, its population was 456, in 100 families.

References 

Populated places in Mohr County